John Harty (8 August 1936 – 27 April 2004) was a South African cricketer. He played in 49 first-class matches for Eastern Province between 1956/57 and 1965/66.

See also
 List of Eastern Province representative cricketers

References

External links
 

1936 births
2004 deaths
South African cricketers
Eastern Province cricketers
People from Makhanda, Eastern Cape
Cricketers from the Eastern Cape